Flak towers were large, above-ground, anti-aircraft gun blockhouse towers constructed by Nazi Germany. There were 8 flak tower complexes in the cities of Berlin (three), Hamburg (two), and Vienna (three) from 1940 onwards. Other cities that used flak towers included Stuttgart and Frankfurt. Smaller single-purpose flak towers were built at key outlying German strongpoints, such as at Angers in France, and Helgoland in Germany.

The towers were operated by the Luftwaffe to defend against Allied strategic air raids against these cities during World War II. They also served as air-raid shelters for tens of thousands of local civilians.

History and uses

After the RAF's raid on Berlin in 1940, Adolf Hitler ordered the construction of three massive flak towers to defend the capital from air attack. Each tower had a radar installation with a radar dish which could be retracted behind a thick concrete and steel dome for protection.

Hitler was interested in the design of the towers, and even made some sketches. They were constructed in six months. The priority of the project was such that the German national rail schedule was altered to facilitate the shipment of concrete, steel and timber to the construction sites.

 
However, only the  FlaK 40 guns had effective range to defend against the RAF and USAAF heavy bombers. The three flak towers around the outskirts of Berlin created a triangle of anti-aircraft fire that covered the centre of Berlin.

During the Battle of Berlin, occupants formed their own communities, with up to  taking refuge in one tower during the battle. These towers, much like the keeps of medieval castles, were some of the safest places in a fought-over city and so the flak towers were some of the last places to surrender to the Red Army, eventually being forced to capitulate as supplies dwindled.

The Soviets, in their assault on Berlin, found it difficult to inflict significant damage on the flak towers, even with some of the largest Soviet guns, such as the 203 mm M1931 howitzers. 

After the war, the demolition of the towers was often considered not feasible and many remain to this day, with some having been converted for alternative use.

Design iterations

Each flak tower complex consisted of:

a G-Tower (German: Gefechtsturm) "Combat Tower", also known as the Gun Tower, Battery Tower or Large Flak Tower, and
an L-Tower (German: Leitturm) "Lead Tower" also known as the Fire-control tower, command tower, listening bunker or small flak tower.

Generation 1
Generation 2
Generation 3

The evaluation of even larger Battery Towers was commissioned by Adolf Hitler. These would have been three times the size and firepower of flak towers.

Towers

Flakturm I – Zoo Tower - Berliner Zoo, Berlin

The tower built near the Berlin Zoo was the first generation type and covered the government district. It was also used as a repository for artefacts from the Berlin museum. The occupants surrendered to Soviets on 30 April 1945.
In 1947 the British blew up the G-Tower on the second attempt with several tons of explosives. The L-Tower was demolished first in July.

Flakturm II – Friedrichshain, Berlin
 Friedrichshain (1st Generation)
 G-Tower was partially demolished after the war; one side remains visible. The tower was caught in low-level aerial footage of the ruined city in 1945.  
 L-Tower was demolished after the war.  

Both towers were covered over and now appear to be natural hills in Volkspark Friedrichshain. The G-Tower, known as Mont Klamott (Rubble Mountain) in Berlin, was the inspiration for songs by singer-songwriter Wolf Biermann and the rock band Silly.

Flakturm III – Humboldthain, Berlin

The third of the first generation flak towers was built at Humboldthain.  
The G-Tower was partially demolished after the war; one side remains visible. The interior can be visited. . The L-Tower was partially demolished after the war; some walls remain visible.

Flakturm IV – Heiligengeistfeld, Hamburg

Heiligengeistfeld (1st Generation)

This tower contains six levels below the rooftop and includes in its design, as part of its air-raid shelter, two identical spaces for protection against gas attacks. One is located on the first floor (above ground level) and the other on the second floor. Both in Tower 1, they are about 300 sq. m. (3,230 sq. ft.) in area, and have six windows (openings in the wall).

The L-Tower was demolished after the war and replaced by a building owned by T-Mobile. . The G-Tower was transformed into a nightclub with a music school and music shops. In 2019 the NH Hotel Group announced plans to turn it into a luxury hotel with a forest on top of it, with construction to take place in 2021 and opening in 2022. After the reconstruction the height was to increase to 58m with some additional floors. There were to be thirteen stairs.

Flakturm VI – Wilhelmsburg, Hamburg

The tower at Wilhelmsburg is a 2nd generation type.
The G-Tower remains to this day, the L-Tower was demolished after the war.

Flakturm V – Stiftskaserne, Vienna

 Stiftskaserne (3rd Generation)
 G-Tower's interior is used by the Austrian Army. 
 L-Tower (in Esterhazypark) has been used as a public aquarium, the Haus des Meeres, since 1957. 
 The outside of the L-Tower was re-purposed as an outdoor climbing wall.

Flakturm VII – Augarten, Vienna
 Augarten (3rd Generation)
 G-Tower remains empty. The entire north-east and half of the east 20 mm gun platforms, including the connecting walkways, were removed in 2007 due to deterioration. The tower itself has been reinforced with steel cables encircling the entire structure: 12 cables are located above the gun nests, 6 just below, and an additional 4 midway up the tower. The tower is home to thousands of pigeons which nest on every platform and opening. The tower suffered an internal explosion, and several floors near the top are missing on one side. The west side of the structure is also used as a cellular communications tower. 
 L-Tower remains empty. Its use as a computer storage facility or an open-air cinema is being considered.

Flakturm VIII – Arenbergpark, Vienna
 Arenbergpark (2nd Generation) 
 G-Tower is used as a storehouse for art.
 L-Tower remains empty.

Planned towers (not built)

Berlin
 Tiergarten (two additional planned, not built)
 Hasenheide in Neukölln (planned, not built, had been built in Hamburg instead)
 Reichstag (considered for modification, but found unsuitable)

Bremen
 Bremen Neustadt Contrescarpe (two planned, none built)

Hamburg
 East Hamburg (planned, not built)

Munich
 München Hauptbahnhof (eight planned, none built)

Vienna
 Original plans were to place the three towers in Schmelz, Prater & Floridsdorf.

See also
 Battle of Berlin
 Defence of the Reich
 Nazi architecture
 Martello tower

References

Further reading
 Foedrowitz, Michael. (1998). The Flak Towers in Berlin, Hamburg and Vienna 1940–1950. Schiffer Publishing. 
 Ute Bauer Die Wiener Flaktürme im Spiegel Österreichischer Erinnerungskultur, Phoibos Verlag, Wien 2003. 
 Flavia Foradini, Edoardo Conte: I templi incompiuti di Hitler, catalogo della mostra omonima, Milano, Spazio Guicciardini, 17.2–13 March 2009
 Valentin E. Wille: Die Flaktürme in Wien, Berlin und Hamburg. Geschichte, Bedeutung und Neunutzung, VDM-Verlag, Saarbrücken 2008, 
 Flavia Foradini: Berlino: Cercando sotto terra le tracce dei ciclopici sogni nazisti, Il Piccolo, Triest, 19 agosto 2012.
 Flavia Foradini: I bunker viennesi, Abitare, Milano, 2.2006

External links

 Several photos of the towers and bunkers 
 Page about the Vienna flak towers 
 What remains of the flaktowers today
 Renovation concept for the Hamburg Flak Tower
 Flaktowers in Berlin, Hamburg and Vienna (short film)

Fortifications by type
Nazi architecture
Anti-aircraft guns of Germany
Weapon fixtures
Battle of Berlin
Towers
Fortifications in Germany
Bunkers in Germany